Shruti Choudhry (born 3 October 1975) is an Indian politician from Indian National Congress.

Early life 
Shruti Choudry was born in New Delhi on 3 October 1975. Her parents were Surender Singh and Kiran Choudhry, both of whom had served as ministers in the government of Haryana. Her paternal grandfather was the former Chief minister of Haryana, Bansi Lal and her family is among the major Political families of Haryana.

Choudhry's early education was at the Convent of Jesus & Mary school and Delhi Public School, R K Puram, after which she studied in Oxford, England. She earned a B.A. from the University of Delhi and then a LL.B. from B. R. Ambedkar University in Agra.  On 7 March 2003, she married with Arunabh Choudhry, a lawyer.

Politics 
At first practising as a lawyer, Choudhry turned to politics following the death of her father in 2005. Choudhry was chosen by the Indian National Congress party to contest the 2009 Indian general election in the Bhiwani-Mahendragarh constituency of the Lok Sabha. Mainly as a consequence of the goodwill that existed for her family in the area, she defeated her nearest rival, Ajay Singh Chautala of the Indian National Lok Dal, by a margin of 55,097 votes. Her grandfather had previously won the same seat three times, and her father had done so twice.

Choudhry served as a member of the Lok Sabha committees for agriculture and empowerment of women from 2009.

Choudhry did not win re-election in 2014.

See also
 Dynastic politics of Haryana
 Bansi Lal

References

External links 
Lok Sabha biographical data

India MPs 2009–2014
People from Bhiwani
1975 births
Living people
Lok Sabha members from Haryana
Women in Haryana politics
United Progressive Alliance candidates in the 2014 Indian general election
Delhi University alumni
Delhi Public School alumni
Indian National Congress politicians from Haryana
21st-century Indian women politicians
21st-century Indian politicians